George Bain may refer to:

 George Bain (artist) (1881–1968), artist who became known as the father of modern Celtic design
 George Bain (journalist) (1920–2006), Canadian journalist
 Sir George Bain (academic) (born 1939), former president and Vice-Chancellor of Queen's University, Belfast
 George Grantham Bain (1865–1944), New Yorker news photographer
 George Bain (rugby league) (1892–1948), Australian rugby league player

See also
 George Baines (disambiguation)